The 2015–16 Hong Kong FA Cup preliminary round is the 41st edition of the Hong Kong FA Cup and the 3rd edition of the Hong Kong FA Cup preliminary round. 42 teams from the Hong Kong First Division League, the Hong Kong Second Division League and the Hong Kong Third Division League competed in the preliminary round. The top 3 teams from the preliminary round (Sun Hei, Tai Po, Wanchai) qualified for the First Round proper in the 2015–16 Hong Kong FA Cup.

Participating teams

Hong Kong First Division League (14 teams):
Citizen
Double Flower
Hong Kong FC
Kwai Tsing
Kwun Tong
Lucky Mile
Metro Gallery Sun Source
Shatin
Sun Hei
Tai Chung
Tai Po
Wanchai
Easyknit Property
Yau Tsim Mong

Hong Kong Second Division League (12 teams):
Eastern District
Happy Valley
Kowloon City
Kwok Keung
Kwong Wah
Sai Kung
Sham Shui Po
Sparta Rotterdam Mutual
Tsuen Wan
Tuen Mun
Tuen Mun FC
Tung Sing

Hong Kong Third Division League (16 teams):
Central & Western
Fukien
GFC Friends
Hoi King
Islands
King Mountain
KCDRSC
Kowloon Cricket Club
New Fair Kui Tan
Ornament
Telecom
REX Global North District
St. Joseph's
Sun International
HKFYG
Wing Go Fu Moon

Fixtures and results

Round 1

Round 2

Round 3

Quarter-finals

Semi-finals

3rd Place

Final

References

External links
FA Cup Preliminary Round  - Hong Kong Football Association

Hong Kong FA Cup